The National Democratic Alliance (NDA) is a social and political movement in the Russian Federation. It supports the creation of several Russian republics, the re-establishment of the Federation, and the establishment of a single federal agreement between the subjects of the Russian Federation. The NDA is co-chaired by Alexey Shiropaev, Ilya Lazarenko, and Mikhail Pozharsky.

The NDA is built as an association of regional movements that are united by a common ideology of achieving national democracy, as well as the goals and objectives laid out in the NDA Manifesto.

NDA is an opposition movement.

Political stances 

 Creation of Russian republics within the Russian Federation and re-establishment of the Federation as a union of national republics.
 Legal recognition by the renewed Russian Federation of the status of the successor state of the Russian Democratic Federative Republic.
 Expansion of the powers of the regions and real federalism.
 The Democratization of the state and the realization of the rights and freedoms of citizens.
 Rejection of neo-imperial foreign policy.
 Anti-Sovietism, anti-communism, and anti-clericalism.
 Restriction of immigration from the countries of the Transcaucasia, Asia, and the Middle East.
 Protection of private property rights and the development of a market economy.
 Legalization of firearms.
 A course towards consistent rapprochement and cooperation with the European Union, NATO and the United States.

NDA program documents – the Manifesto and Resolution "On the re-establishment of the Russian Federation and the creation of Russian republics" – were adopted at the Constituent Conference.

The movement regularly makes political statements in defence of a free economy, political freedoms, reform of the MVD The NDA officially established friendly relations with the Latvian party Visu Latvijai!

Symbolism 
A nettle leaf is selected as the NDA symbol. Movement colors: white, green, black. The colors green and black are especially popular due to the respectful attitude of the NDA participants towards the insurgency in the Russian Civil War.

Political actions 

 Moscow and Baltic tea drinking.
 Picket against amendments to the "Law on the FSB".
 Participates in Strategy-31.
 Collection of signatures in support of the initiative for the withdrawal of Stavropol Krai from the North Caucasian Federal District.
 Film club work.
 Picket "No empire of lies!" in Ostankino.
 Participation in a rally of the Belarusian opposition against the results of the presidential elections in Belarus in Minsk on December 19, 2010.
 Participation in the rally "For Russia without Putin".
 The action "Vlasov Ribbon".
 Visit to Israel. Meeting with MKs Ayoob Kara (Likud) and Aryeh Eldad (National Union.
 Participation together with the Movement "For Faith and Fatherland" in the organization of the round table "Neo-Sovietism as a phenomenon of our days".
 Participation jointly with the ODD "Solidarnost" in the organization of the conference "North Caucasus: Together or Apart?"
 Participation in a meeting on Bolotnaya Square on December 10, 2011.
 Banquet in honor of the 68th anniversary of the establishment of the Committee for the Liberation of the Peoples of Russia (KONR) November 14, 2012.

References

External links
Сайт Национал-Демократического Альянса
ru_nazdem — сообщество  «Национал-демократический альянс» в «Живом Журнале»
Русские националисты сошлись в Израиле с правыми сионистами
Арье Эльдад принял в Кнессете делегацию НДА России
Визит русских националистов в Израиль: встреча с Аюбом Кара
Российские национал-демократы ищут союзников в Израиле
Первый круглый стол израильских и российских националистов

2010 establishments in Russia
Anti-clericalism
Anti-communism in Russia
Anti-communist parties
Anti-immigration politics in Russia
Federalist organizations
Liberalism in Russia
National liberalism
Opposition to Vladimir Putin
Organizations established in 2010
Political organizations based in Russia
Pro-Europeanism
Russian nationalist organizations